Georges Talbourdet (5 December 1951 – 5 December 2011) was a French racing cyclist. His sporting career began with La Hutte-Gitane. He won the French national road race title in 1974.

References

External links
 

1951 births
2011 deaths
French male cyclists
Sportspeople from Côtes-d'Armor
Cyclists from Brittany